Satyan, (Satyan Mahalingam), is an Indian playback singer and composer. He is best known for performing the hit numbers "Kalakkapovathu Yaaru" (Vasool Raja MBBS), "Sil Sil" (Arinthum Ariyamalum) and the title track from Boss Engira Bhaskaran and Thee Mugam Dhaan (Nerkonda Paarvai)

Biography

Early life
Satyan Mahalingam was born on 31 May 1980 to Mr. Mahalingam and  Mrs. Mariammal in Chennai, India. During his high school and college years, he was called "Needhi Mohan", but changed his name into "M. Satyan" later on.
He developed interest in music at an early age and started singing in light music orchestras at the age of 15. Though he completed MBA, his passion towards music made him pursue musical career. He married Ms.Nithya Rengarajan in 2009 and the couple has 2 daughters viz Sudhantra and Niranthra

Career
Satyan had been singing in numerous light music orchestras since 1996. He had also performed for many of the leading orchestras in Tamil Nadu. In fact, he had performed in more than 2500 stage shows during his singing career as a light music singer.

In 2004, Satyan entered the Tamil Film Industry, was introduced by Music Director Baradwaj. He started his career as a play back singer in the film Vasool Raja MBBS by singing the popular songKalakka Povadhu Yaaru with Padmasree Kamalhaasan. Subsequently, Satyan had sung over 150 songs in Tamil, Telugu and Kannada films. 
He had performed several star musical shows in India and all over the world in countries like Canada, United States, Australia, Japan, Hongkong, Malaysia, Singapore, Dubai, Sri Lanka, London, Paris and Russia.
Besides being a playback singer, Satyan had also been working as music composer since 2008. He had composed and programmed over 100 jingles and music albums for Shakthi FM, Sri Lanka and for various ad agencies in India. Notably, he composed a devotional song for the Nallur Murugan Temple (Sri Lanka), which was sung by legendary singers, lateT. M. Soundararajan and P. Susheela. He has also composed devotional songs sung by great singers like Late S.P Balasubramaniam, Vani Jeyaram, T.L Maharajan, L.R Eswari and Mano.

Satyan gave his debut as Music Composer in Tamil Film Industry in the movie Vizhithiru. He is currently working as composer in 3 movies in Telugu, Kannada and Malayalam.

He also has a his own Music Live Band called ASTHRAAS, which has performed all over the world.

Playback singing

Discography

Playback performances
The following is an incomplete list of popular songs sung by Satyan Mahalingam.

Others

Compositions
Produced by SHAKTHI FM (Sri Lanka):
A devotional song for the Nallur Murugan Temple (Sri Lanka), sung by T. M. Soundararajan and P. Susheela
An Islamic devotional song, performed by Mano
A song for the Thiruketheeswaram Temple in Mannar (Sri Lanka), sung by S. P. Balasubrahmanyam
A Murugan song for Kathirgamam Murugan Temple, sung by T. L. Maharajan & Seergazhi Siva Chidambaram
A Devine song for Mayuraapathi BADRAKALI, sung by Vani Jairam
A devotional song for the Nayina Theevu Naagabooshini Amman Temple, sung by L.R.Eashwari

Others
Music for a 30-minute short film En Uyir Thozan, directed by Surya (son of the famous writer Balakumaran)
A one-hour television film Fair & Lovely, directed by Surya
A re-recording for a television film, directed by Sharavana Subbiah
Music for feature film Vizhithiru (2017).
music for serial in sun TV 
kanmani serial (2019)

music album for flood with actor vishal and producer council thenappan (2017) 
chennaiye meendum vaa
music for future Kannada film 
LOVE 2020

References
satyan singer Facebook page

External links
 
Satyanmahalingam on Instagram
Satyanmahalingam on Facebook

Asthraas on YouTube

1980 births
Living people
Singers from Chennai
Indian male playback singers
Tamil playback singers